Puthanathani is a census town in Malappuram district in the state of Kerala, India. The town lies on the National Highway 66 (India), between Kottakkal and Valanchery. Roads to Vailathur (and hence Tirur) and Thirunavaya also can be seen in Puthanathani.

Demographics
 India census, Puthanathani had a population of 20,480, with 10,000 males and 10,480 females.
A good number of people from Puthanathani and around are now working overseas, mostly in the Gulf countries.

Culture
Puthanathani is a predominantly Muslim populated area. Business and family issues are also sorted out during these evening meetings.  The Hindu minority of this area keeps their rich traditions by celebrating various festivals in their temples.  Hindu rituals are done here with a regular devotion like other parts of Kerala.

Basic information about Puthanathani
{ "type": "ExternalData",  "service": "geoshape",  "ids": "Q18346018"}

Transportation
Puthanathani connects to other parts of India through Kottakkal town.  National Highway No.66 passes through Kottakkal and the northern stretch connects to Goa and Mumbai.  The southern stretch connects to Cochin and Trivandrum.  State Highway No.28 starts from Nilambur and connects to Ooty, Mysore, and Bangalore through Highways.12,29, and 181. National Highway No.966 connects to Palakkad and Coimbatore.  The nearest airport is at Kondotty.  The nearest major railway station is at Tirur, Tirunnavaya railway station

Educational institutions 
There are many schools both private and government and 4 colleges & 1 polytechnic in Puthanathani.

Places of interest

Ayyapanov Waterfalls 
waterfalls Situated at Athavanad Near Puthanathani

Padiyath Gulminar

Nellithadam View Point

Jamalullaily Juma Masjid Cheloor

Puthanathani Darga

Narasimha Moorthy Temple Punnathala

Other landmarks 
 Chelakkode Punnathala
 Kallingal
 Kurumbathoor
 Punnathala Village
 Chungam
 Kuttikalathani
 Athirumada
 Cherulal 
 Cheloor

Hospitals
 Supriya Speciality Hospital (SSH)
 PMSA Orphanage Hospital
 BDS HOSPITAL
 NHC polyclinic and dialysis center

See also
 Athavanad Grama Panchayat
 Thunchath Ezhuthachan Malayalam University
 Chelakkode Punnathala
 Tirunnavaya railway station
 Ayyapanov Waterfalls

References

External links 
 
 
  
 
 
 

Villages in Malappuram district
Cities and towns in Malappuram district
Kottakkal area
Malappuram
Populated coastal places in India